Gusheh komar (also Romanized as Gūsheh Kamar; also known as Gūsh Kamar) is a village in Kuh Yakhab Rural District, Dastgerdan District, Tabas County, South Khorasan Province, Iran. At the 2006 census, its population was 23, in 6 families.

References 

Populated places in Tabas County